Yellow is the debut studio album by South African rapper, Shane Eagle. It was released on August 31, 2017, by Eagle Entertainment.

Eagle posted on Twitter and Instagram that he wanted the album to achieve gold status. He released hard copies of the album with a bonus track titled "75". He started promoting the hashtag #20KOutTheTrunk to inform fans of the various locations he will be across the country. On October 5, 2017, he began the #20KOutTheTrunk campaign in Pretoria, South Africa.  Production was mainly handled by Hughes and longtime friend Andile Khumalo, aka Shooter Khumz, with the assistance of in-house producers, Taybeats and SP Dubb.

Track listing

References

2017 debut albums
Shane Eagle albums